Morning Light is a 1916 painting by the Australian artist Elioth Gruner. The painting depicts a small herd of dairy cows in a grassy field in the morning with a man, the farmer, in the foreground. Hailed as the high point of [his] Emu Plains series" and "one of his greatest masterpieces", Morning Light was awarded the Wynne Prize in 1916.

Morning Light was largely painted en plein air at Emu Plains—now an outer western suburb of Sydney but then a rural area—on a farm owned by James Innes.  Elioth Gruner's 1919 painting Spring Frost also shows this farm.

Gruner was influenced by Melbourne artist Max Meldrum's tonal theory as well as the brushwork of E Phillips Fox. The work also shows influence from modernist contemporaries Grace Cossington Smith and Roland Wakelin.

The work was first exhibited at the Society of Artists' annual exhibition in Sydney in November 1916 and made Gruner's reputation.

After winning the Wynne Prize the work was immediately purchased by the Art Gallery of New South Wales and remains part of its collection.

References

External links
Morning Light — Art Gallery of New South Wales collection

1916 paintings
Australian paintings
Cattle in art
Collections of the Art Gallery of New South Wales
Wynne Prize
Paintings by Elioth Gruner